The Gerald Loeb Award is given annually for multiple categories of business reporting. The "International" category was first awarded in 2013.

Gerald Loeb Award for International (2013–present)

 2013: "China's Secret Fortunes" by David Barboza and Sharon LaFraniere, The New York Times

Articles in Series:
"Billions Amassed in the Shadows By the Family of China's Premier", October 26, 2012
"Lobbying, a Windfall and a Leader's Family", November 25, 2012
"Chinese Regulator's Relatives Profited From Stake in Insurer", December 31, 2012
"China 'Princelings' Using Family Ties to Gain Riches", May 18, 2012

 2014: "The Shortest Route to Riches" by Kerry A. Dolan and Rafael Marques de Morais, Forbes
 2015: "Product of Mexico" by Richard Marosi and Don Bartletti, Los Angeles Times
 2016: “Malaysia’s Missing Millions,” by Tom Wright, Bradley Hope, Simon Clark, Mia Lamar, Justin Baer, Tom Di Fonzo, and Paolo Bosonin, The Wall Street Journal
 2017: "Venezuela Undone" by Hannah Dreier and Ricardo Nunes, Associated Press

Articles in Series:
"Amid food crisis, life on the line in Venezuela", July 11, 2016
"Life on the line in Venezuela as exonomic crisis worsens", July 12, 2016
"Middle-class Venezuelans liquidate savings to stockpile food", July 18, 2016
"Venezuela military trafficking food as country goes hungry", December 28, 2016

 2018: "China's Surveillance State" by Josh Chin, Liza Lin, Eva Dou, Clément Bürge, Wenxin Fan, Natasha Khan, Dan Strumpf, Charles Rollet, Jeremy Page, Elliot Bentley, Jenny O'Grady, Tyler Paige, and Giulia Marchi, The Wall Street Journal
 2019: Andy Greenberg, Wired

Article:
"The Code that Crashed the World: The Untold Story of NotPetya, the Most Devastating Cyberattack in History", August 2, 2018

 2020: "WhatsApp International" by Mehul Srivastava, Tom Wilson, Tim Bradshaw, and Robert Smith, Financial Times
 2021: "Fruits of Labor" by Margie Mason and Robin McDowell, Associated Press

Articles in Series:
"Palm oil abuses linked to world's top brands, banks", September 23, 2020
"US says it will block palm oil from large Malaysian producer", September 30, 2020
"Rape, abuses in palm oil fields linked to top beauty brands", November 17, 2020
"US bans second Malaysian palm oil giant over forced labor", December 30, 2020

 2022: "China Propaganda" by Paul Mozur, Raymond Zhong, Jeff Kao, Aaron Krolik, Aliza Aufrichtig, Muyi Xiao, Nailah Morgan, and Gray Beltran, The New York Times and ProPublica

Articles:
"Beijing Silenced Peng Shuai in 20 Minutes, Then Spent Weeks on Damage Control" by Paul Mozur, Muyi Xiao, Jeff Kao, and Gray Beltran, December 8, 2021
"How Beijing Influences the Influencers" by Paul Mozur, Raymond Zhong, Aaron Krolik, Aliza Aufrichtig, and Nailah Morgan, December 13, 2021
"Buying Influence: How China Manipulates Facebook and Twitter" by Muyi Xiao, Paul Mozur and Gray Beltran, December 20, 2021
"A Digital Manhunt: How Chinese Police Track Critics on Twitter and Facebook" by Muyi Xiao and Paul Mozu, December 31, 2021

References

External links
 Gerald Loeb Award historical winners list

American journalism awards
Gerald Loeb Award winners